Iridomyrmex curvifrons is a species of ant in the genus Iridomyrmex. Described in 2011, all known specimens have been collected in south-east Queensland.

References

Iridomyrmex
Hymenoptera of Australia
Insects described in 2011